Dripstone may refer to:
Hood mould or dripstone, an architectural feature for handling rain water
 Dripstone, a type of speleothem (cave formation) that includes for example stalactites
 Dripstone, a type of water filter made of porous stone
 Dripstone, New South Wales